St Michael and All Angels Church is a Grade II listed church in Bude, Cornwall.

History

It was originally built in 1834 by George Wightwick for Sir Thomas Dyke Acland, 10th Baronet as a Chapel of Ease to Stratton Parish Church.  The church was expanded in 1878 by Edward Ashworth for Sir Thomas Dyke Acland, 11th Baronet. It became a listed building on 9 September 1985.

Organ

The organ dates from 1923 and was built by G. Jackson. A specification of the organ can be found on the National Pipe Organ Register.

References

Bude
Grade II listed churches in Cornwall
Churches completed in 1834
Churches completed in 1878
Anglo-Catholic church buildings in Cornwall
Bude